The 2023 Indian Premier League (also known as IPL 16, TATA IPL 2023 due to sponsorship reasons), is upcoming 16th season of the Indian Premier League (IPL), a franchise based Twenty20 cricket league in India. It is owned– operated by Board of Control for Cricket in India (BCCI). Gujarat Titans are the defending champions. 

From this season onwards, IPL will return to its original Home and away format, after a gap of 4 years due to the COVID-19 Pandemic and the previous 3 seasons being held at neutral venues. The 10 teams will play their home games at their predetermined home grounds across the nation.  

From this season onwards for next 5 years Jio Cinema app of Viacom18  will broadcast it on internet while Star Sports will do the same on television in India.  In this season the participating team will be able to appeal for review of No balls and Wide balls to the 3rd umpire.

Background
The BCCI introduced an Impact Player rule ahead of the season. Teams can name four substitutes, or impact players, in their squad for a match in addition to the starting XI. One of these may be used as a substitute during the match. Teams can now also review wides and no-balls using DRS, as introduced in the WPL.

Opening ceremony 
After the gap of four years, opening ceremony will take place in this season. It is reported that Bollywood actors will perform in 1 hour ceremony. It is scheduled to take place in Narendra Modi Stadium before the first game.

Personnel changes

In November 2022, Shikhar Dhawan replaced Mayank Agarwal as the captain of Punjab Kings. Anil Kumble was also replaced by Trevor Bayliss as head coach of Punjab Kings. In August 2022, Chandrakant Pandit replaced Brendon McCullum as head coach of Kolkata Knight Riders. Tom Moody was also replaced by Brian Lara as head coach of Sunrisers Hyderabad.

The IPL auction took place on 23 December 2022 in Kochi.

Venues  

The league stage will be played across 12 venues in India, while the playoffs phase of the schedule is yet to be announced. Guwahati will be making its IPL debut and will be hosting the first 2 home games of Rajasthan Royals before they play their remaining 5 home games at Jaipur, while Dharamsala will be making its return to IPL after a 10-year hiatus and will be hosting the final 2 home games of Punjab Kings after they play their first 5 home games at Mohali. The other 8 teams will be playing all their home games at their traditional home grounds.

Tickets 
In this season, audience can purchase match tickets online from Paytm Insider and Book my show mobile applications, will be able to buy tickets at arenas from box-office. The price for a ticket is ₹ 800–10,000. Viewer from age 2 will require a ticket to witness the game in arena. The ticket selling application such as BookMyShow & Paytm will send tickets at buyers home atleast 2–3 days before the game.

Format
Teams are divided in two groups that is A and B. Each team will play 7 home and away games, facing the opposite group teams twice. Teams within the same group with play against each other once. Total seventy games will be organised throughout the country in 12 arenas.

Points Table

Match summary

League stage 

The schedule for the group stages was published on 17 February 2023.

Matches

Playoffs

Qualifier 1

Eliminator

Qualifier 2

Final

Broadcasting 

Star Sports renewed its television contract, and the Viacom18  exclusively acquired the streaming rights, they will streamed all the matches on the Jio Cinema android application. 

First time ever IPL matches will be streamed in 4K (Ultra HD); it will be streamed free to air in India on Jio Cinema apk. Viewers will be able to switch camera angles, language of commentry and graphics during the live matches. 

DAZN sheduled to telecast IPL 2023 and ITV will air 16 matches on free to air basis in United Kingdom. While in USA Willow TV will air it on television and ESPN + application on internet.

See also
 Sports culture in India
 Controversies involving the Indian Premier League

References

External links

Series home at ESPN Cricinfo

2023 Indian Premier League
Indian Premier League seasons
Domestic cricket competitions in 2022–23
2023 in Indian cricket